Gargždai Stadium is a multi-use stadium in Gargždai, Lithuania. It is mostly used for football matches and hosts the home games of the team, FK Banga Gargždai, of the A Lyga.  The capacity of the stadium is 2,323 spectators.

External links
 Stadium information

Football venues in Lithuania
Buildings and structures in Klaipėda County